Tryphaena may refer to:

 Tryphaena (ca 141 BC - 111 BC), Ptolemaic princess, wife of Antiochus VIII Grypus, queen of Syria
 Saint Tryphaena of Cyzicus (fl. 1st century AD), Roman Christian martyr
 Tryphaena Cleopatraina may refer to:
 Cleopatra V Tryphaena
 Cleopatra VI Tryphaena
 Antonia Tryphaena (10 BC - 55), Queen of Thrace
 Tryphaena is a character in the Satyricon of Petronius